Rafael Hertzberg (18 September 1845 in Turku – 5 December 1896 in Helsingfors) was a Finland-Swedish writer, translator, historian, businessman, inventor and publicist.

Biography
Rafael Hertzberg studied at the Imperial Alexander University (current University of Helsinki) where he graduated with a licentiate degree in 1889.  He worked as a literature, theater and art critic at Helsingfors Dagblad from the end of the 1860s and from 1875–1888 as the newspaper's cultural editor. He later worked at Hufvudstadsbladet and was offered  the position of chief editor in 1890.

In the 1890s, Hertzberg was also acting as a Finnish agent for foreign life insurance companies. He also designed a typewriter  which was manufactured and marketed by  Husqvarna under the trade name Sampo during 1894–95.

As a translator, he initially devoted himself to traditional Finnish folk songs. He performed the first Swedish translation of the play  A Doll's House by Henrik Ibsen (1880. He wrote the libretto for Jean Sibelius’ sole opera, Jungfrun i tornet (1896). He also wrote plays, including dramatizations of the poems of Johan Ludvig Runeberg.

He is today mostly known for writing the lyrics of the Christmas song Julpolska ("Nu ha vi ljus här i vårt hus ")  with music by Johanna Ölander (1827-1909).

He died during 1896 and was buried at Hietaniemi Cemetery in the Etu-Töölö district of Helsinki.

References

External links
 
 

1845 births
1896 deaths
Finnish translators
19th-century translators
Finnish inventors
Public relations people
Finnish writers
19th-century Finnish historians
19th-century Finnish businesspeople
Writers from Turku
Finnish lyricists
Opera librettists
Swedish-speaking Finns